Martin's bent-toed gecko (Cyrtodactylus martini) is a species of gecko that is endemic to northwestern Vietnam.

References 

Cyrtodactylus
Reptiles described in 2011